Charlie J. Allen (September 25, 1908 – November 19, 1972) was an American jazz trumpeter.

Early life 
Born in Jackson, Mississippi, Allen grew up in Chicago and began playing music after graduating from high school in 1925.

Career 
Allen was a member of the bands of Hugh Swift (1925), Dave Peyton (1927), Doc Cook (1927), Clifford King (1928), and Johnny Long. Allen worked with Earl Hines from 1931 to 1934, then did a short stint in Duke Ellington's orchestra in 1935, though he never recorded any solos with Ellington. He played with Fletcher Butler in 1936 and then returned to play with Hines again in 1937.

Allen played in various groups in Chicago in the 1940s and 1950s. Later in his life he became a music educator, worked in the Chicago Musicians' Union, and designed custom trumpet mouthpieces (used by Cat Anderson, among others).

References 
Footnotes

General references
"Charlie Allen". Grove Jazz online.

1908 births
1972 deaths
American jazz trumpeters
American male trumpeters
20th-century American musicians
Musicians from Jackson, Mississippi
Musicians from Chicago
20th-century trumpeters
Jazz musicians from Illinois
Jazz musicians from Mississippi
20th-century American male musicians
American male jazz musicians